Anushawan was the grandson of Ara the Handsome, the legendary king of Armenia.

Due to his divination from the sound of the leaves at the Armenian royal capital of Armavir, Anushawan was referred to as sawsanuēr ("devoted to the plane tree"). Anushawan's name is a combination of the Middle Iranian word anoyš ("immortal"), and possibly the Iranian suffix -van. His name may have been a corruption of Anušarvan ("of immortal soul"), possibly linked with the tale of the resurrection of Ara.

References

Sources 
 

Armenian mythology